The 1970 Oakland Athletics season involved the A's finishing second in the American League West with a record of 89 wins and 73 losses. In 1970, owner Charlie Finley officially changed the team name from the Athletics to the "A's". An "apostrophe-s" was added to the cap and uniform emblem to reflect that fact.

Offseason 
During the off-season, Reggie Jackson sought an increase in salary, and A's owner Charlie Finley threatened to send Jackson to the minors. Commissioner Bowie Kuhn successfully intervened in their dispute. Reggie Jackson demanded $60,000 per season, while he was offered $40,000 by Charlie Finley. Both parties settled on $45,000, but Jackson's numbers in 1970 dropped sharply, as he hit just 23 home runs while batting .237.

Notable transactions 
 December 1, 1969: Manny Trillo was drafted by the Athletics from the Philadelphia Phillies in the 1969 rule 5 draft.
 December 5, 1969: Danny Cater and Ossie Chavarria were traded by the Athletics to the New York Yankees for Al Downing and Frank Fernández.
 December 7, 1969: George Lauzerique and Ted Kubiak were traded by the Athletics to the Milwaukee Brewers for Diego Seguí and Ray Oyler.
 January 15, 1970: Phil Roof, Mike Hershberger, Lew Krausse Jr., and Ken Sanders were traded by the Athletics to the Milwaukee Brewers for Don Mincher and Ron Clark.
 January 17, 1970: 1970 Major League Baseball Draft (January Draft) notable picks:
Round 4: Mitchell Page (did not sign)
Secondary Phase
Round 1: Vic Harris

Regular season 
During the 1970 season, there were rumours of the Athletics attempting to relocate to Toronto.
At the end of May, the Athletics were 25–23, and 8 games back of the first place Minnesota Twins.
September 21: Vida Blue threw a no-hitter versus the Minnesota Twins.
The club hired Harry Caray to do the play by play for the Athletics. Charlie Finley wanted Caray to change his broadcast chant of Holy Cow to Holy Mule. Caray refused and left after the season.

Season standings

Record vs. opponents

Notable transactions 
 May 18, 1970: Roberto Peña was traded by the Athletics to the Milwaukee Brewers for John Donaldson.
 June 4, 1970: 1970 Major League Baseball Draft (June Draft) notable picks:
Round 1: Dan Ford (18th pick)
 June 11, 1970: Al Downing and Tito Francona were traded by the Athletics to the Milwaukee Brewers for Steve Hovley.

Roster

Player stats

Batting

Starters by position 
Note: Pos = Position; G = Games played; AB = At bats; H = Hits; Avg. = Batting average; HR = Home runs; RBI = Runs batted in

Other batters 
Note: G = Games played; AB = At bats; H = Hits; Avg. = Batting average; HR = Home runs; RBI = Runs batted in

Pitching

Starting pitchers 
Note: G = Games pitched; IP = Innings pitched; W = Wins; L = Losses; ERA = Earned run average; SO = Strikeouts

Other pitchers 
Note: G = Games pitched; IP = Innings pitched; W = Wins; L = Losses; ERA = Earned run average; SO = Strikeouts

Relief pitchers 
Note: G = Games pitched; W = Wins; L = Losses; SV = Saves; ERA = Earned run average; SO = Strikeouts

Awards and honors
Bert Campaneris led the American League in Stolen Bases (42)

Farm system

References

External links
1970 Oakland Athletics team page at Baseball Reference
1970 Oakland Athletics team page at www.baseball-almanac.com

Oakland Athletics seasons
Oakland Athletics season
1970 in sports in California